Jonathan Buckley (born 1 January 1992) is a Democratic Unionist Party (DUP) politician who has been a Member of the Northern Ireland Assembly (MLA) for Upper Bann since 2017.

Early life 
Buckley grew up outside Portadown, where he still lives today.

Political career 
Buckley has been a member of the Northern Ireland Assembly (MLA) for Upper Bann since 2017. He succeeded retiring veteran legislator Sydney Anderson. During the campaign, he publicly exhorted voters in the constituency to vote and to transfer to other Unionist candidates. He was declared the winner on 3 March 2017. This made Buckley the youngest elected representative for the DUP.

In October 2021 Buckley voted against ‘safe zones’ outside abortion clinics, saying the move which supporters claim is designed to protect women from physical and verbal harassment was “regressive”.

In May 2022, Buckley admitted that he was "surprised" to learn that he had been nominated by Anne Donaghy's office for an MBE for "political and public service".

Personal life 
Outside of politics, Buckley is involved in pigeon racing. On 1 July 2022, Buckley married Jill Porter in Lisburn.

References

1991 births
Living people
Date of birth missing (living people)
Place of birth missing (living people)
Democratic Unionist Party MLAs
Northern Ireland MLAs 2017–2022
Councillors in Northern Ireland
Northern Ireland MLAs 2022–2027